Fellows & Co were a shipbuilders based in Great Yarmouth in the English county of Norfolk. The yard was established by James Lovewell, who died in 1824. After his death it was  acquired by the Fellows family. The yard was acquired by Richards (Shipbuilders) Ltd of Lowestoft in 1970, but was closed in the late 1980s.

Ships built
Ships built by Fellows & Co include:
 MV Coronia
 MV Western Belle
 Thames Barge Will

References

Companies based in Norfolk
Manufacturing companies established in 1824
Great Yarmouth
Defunct shipbuilding companies of England
1824 establishments in England
British companies established in 1824